Pyle's Massacre, (also Pyle's defeat, Pyle's hacking match, or Battle of Haw River), was fought during the American Revolutionary War in present-day Alamance County on February 24, 1781. The battle was between Patriot troops attached to the Continental Army under Colonel Henry Lee and the Loyalist North Carolina militia commanded by Dr. John Pyle.  Due to the unique uniform design of his forces, the Loyalists mistakenly thought Colonel Lee was the expected British cavalry commander, Banastre Tarleton, who was known to be en route to reinforce Pyle.  When Lee's men opened fire, they took Pyle's force totally by surprise. This resulted in an extremely lopsided victory for Lee, and Pyle's command was scattered and routed.

Background

British general the Earl Cornwallis had been unable to catch Nathanael Greene's army (in what historians now call the "Race to the Dan"), who strategically retreated using a screening feint column under Col. Otho Williams, to Dix's Ferry (present day Danville, VA) allowing Greene to cross the Dan River at Irwin's (Turbeville, VA) and Boyd's Ferry (South Boston, VA) and out of North Carolina.  Cornwallis, who had burned his baggage train at Ramsour's Mill (Lincolnton, NC), in chasing Greene completely exhausted his men, who were also starving in wet freezing  weather with little forage from locals. All the boats for crossing the Dan River were taken by Greene (Colonel Henry Lee in command of the rear guard cavalry was the last to cross approx. 2 hours before the British arrived) so that Cornwallis was stranded on the NC side of the river. Cornwallis made an exhaustive trip South, establishing a headquarters to regroup and recover at Hillsborough, North Carolina, a colonial outpost city, on February 21, also to rally Loyalists to his side.

Dr. John Pyle (1723–1804) had moved to Chatham County in 1767. Noted for his loyalty to the King, he had assisted the Governor in the War of the Regulation, though he was not at the Battle of Alamance. When Cornwallis appealed for Loyalist volunteers, Pyle gathered between 300 and 400 men. He requested Cornwallis provide his men with an  escort, and Banastre Tarleton with his cavalry and a small force of infantry, a total of about 450 men, marched to lead Pyle to safety.

General Greene spent days in Virginia from the 15th to the 22nd, where he was able to resupply, feed his troops, medically recover his wounded and gain reinforcements. On February 17 he detached Colonel Henry Lee with his cavalry, and Colonel Andrew Pickens with Maryland infantry and South Carolina militia, to recross the Dan and monitor British activity. This force crossed the Dan on February 18 and set up a hidden camp along the road between Hillsborough and Haw River crossing points. From there Lee sent scouts to watch for British movements.

Word came the next morning that Tarleton was moving toward the Haw with an estimated 400 men. Lee and Pickens followed behind Tarleton, who, they learned, had camped near the Haw. A planned attack was called off when scouts reported that Tarleton had again moved, after the militia companies he was expecting to meet did not show up. Pyle's force had delayed its movement (in violation of orders) to visit with family and friends before setting off.

At noon on February 24, Lee and Pickens captured two British staff officers and learned through interrogation that Tarleton was only a few miles ahead. In the waning hours of the day, Lee's Legion, who wore short green jackets and plumed helmets, encountered two of Pyle's men, who mistook them for Tarleton's dragoons, who wore similar uniforms. Lee used this to his advantage and learned that Pyle's troops were nearby. Lee instructed Pickens' riflemen to flank Pyle's position, and then trotted into the camp in full salute. Lee exchanged customary civilities with Colonel Pyle and began shaking his hand when the sounds of battle commenced.

Battle
The most commonly accepted account of the battle, pieced together from reports from Lee and Captain Joseph Graham, indicates that Lee's deception was purely chance, and that he had originally intended to avoid the Loyalists, intending instead to encounter Tarleton's Dragoons, the more important objective.  The sounds of battle apparently commenced when the militia at the rear of Lee's Legion, recognizing the strips of red cloth on the hats of Pyle's men as the badge of Loyalists, alerted Captain Eggleston, who was new to the South and was not familiar with local Whig and Tory badges.  When he asked one of the Loyalists which side he was on, the man replied "King George", and Eggleston responded by striking him on the head with his sabre.  Seeing this, Pickens' riflemen joined in the attack.  The cavalry line turned and also attacked the Loyalists.  Pyle's men broke and ran, but many were either killed or wounded in the early exchanges.  Many Loyalists, believing the attack to be a mistake, continued insisting they were on King George's side, to no avail.  After 10 minutes, the remaining Loyalists had fled, and 93 Loyalists were known to be dead, certainly more were wounded and others were seen being carried off by friends.  According to local legend, John Pyle was badly wounded in the battle and crawled into a nearby pond where he concealed himself until he could be rescued.  After recovering from his wounds, he surrendered to the local militia.  Later they were pardoned because of Dr. Pyle's care for wounded patriots.

Aftermath
Pickens and Lee never caught up with Tarleton, since Cornwallis ordered him to rejoin the main army on the night of February 24.  Though pursued, Tarleton eventually got too close to the main British army for Pickens and Lee to attack safely. Additionally, Nathanael Greene's recovered army crossed the Dan River back into NC on February 22, proceeding for contact and action at Guilford Courthouse on March 15, 1781. Lee and Pickens broke off to screen and join the campaign, their task to demoralize and discourage Loyalist volunteers from adding to the diminishing British forces having been successful.

There were reports of atrocities committed by Catawba Indians in a late-arriving company, with claims that men were butchered after asking for quarter.  The British were quick to denounce the incident as a massacre.  Cornwallis, in a letter to Lord George Germain, reported that most of Pyle's force were "inhumanly butchered, when begging for quarters, without making the least resistance."  Lee later noted that if he had wanted a massacre he would have chased down the remnants of Pyle's company.  Rather, Lt. Col. Lee allowed those who wished to run away do so in the successful strategy of putting off the fantasy tales of the British Army of their superior cavalry, etc., and help put an end to recruiting efforts by the Loyalists in N. Carolina for the British, as described by Lee in his memoir, "Memoirs of the War in the Southern Department of the United States" and in 1969 republished by Arno Press, Inc., New York as "The American Revolution In The South." Ch 27.

The battle occurred a few weeks before the Battle of Guilford Courthouse and was a contributing factor in weakening British troop numbers and morale.

As late as the 1850s, local residents could point out the location of the battle and the mass graves of those killed during the skirmish; at least one known mass grave has been recently relocated. The site is marked with periwinkle and cedar trees and at one time had a stone marker (placed in 1880), which has since been removed from the site; the marker's current location is unknown.

See also
List of massacres in North Carolina

Notes

References

Further reading
"Memoirs of the War in the Southern Department of the United States" By Henry (light horse) Lee. Arno Press, Inc. New York 1969. Library of Congress Catalog Card No. 75-76561.

External links

 Our Pyle Line - A family history of the Pyles that includes an account of Pyle's Massacre written by Dr. George Troxler of Elon University.
 Deception at the Racepath; description of book by Carole W. Troxler of Elon University

Massacres in 1781
Alamance County, North Carolina
Conflicts in 1781
1781 in North Carolina
Battles of the American Revolutionary War in North Carolina
Battles in the Southern theater of the American Revolutionary War 1780–1783
History of North Carolina
Massacres in the American Revolutionary War